The Judge is a 1960 Swedish drama film directed by Alf Sjöberg. It is based on the 1957 play Domaren by Vilhelm Moberg. It was entered into the 1961 Cannes Film Festival.

Cast
 Ingrid Thulin as Brita Randel
 Gunnar Hellström as Albert Arnold, lawyer
 Per Myrberg as Krister Langton
 Georg Rydeberg as Edvard Cunning, judge
 Naima Wifstrand as Mrs. Wangendorff
 Ulf Palme as Psychiatrist
 Åke Lindström as Lanner, editor
 Elof Ahrle as Thorvald, editor
 Holger Löwenadler as Justice ombudsman
 Olof Widgren as Judge of the State Court
 Georg Årlin as Manager Randel
 Ingrid Borthen as Mrs. Randel
 Inga Gill as Waitress
 Hugo Björne as Mayor
 Herman Ahlsell as Chief of police
 Carl-Axel Elfving as Assistant
 Karl Erik Flens as Janitor (as Erik Flens)
 Siv Ericks as Secretary

References

External links

1960 films
1960s Swedish-language films
1960 drama films
Swedish black-and-white films
Films based on works by Vilhelm Moberg
Films directed by Alf Sjöberg
1960s Swedish films